Sylvia Margaret Kay (16 May 1936 – 18 January 2019) was an English character actress who had many roles in British television programmes, most notably as Daphne Warrender in the BBC sitcom Just Good Friends.

Early life
She attended Roundhay High School for Girls in Leeds.

Career
Kay appeared in films such as That Kind of Girl (1963), Rapture (1965), Wake in Fright (1971) (directed by her then-husband Ted Kotcheff), and Coming Out of the Ice (1982).  She also appeared in the television dramas The Avengers (1968), Crown Court, Dalziel and Pascoe, Shelley, Z-Cars, Dead of Night, Minder, Jeeves and Wooster,  Just Good Friends, The Professionals and an episode of Public Eye (1968). As landlady Dorothy Lawson, she appeared in 29 episodes of the first series of Rooms (1974–77).

Personal life
Sylvia was married twice. In 1962 she married the Canadian director, Ted Kotcheff with whom she had three children, Aaron, Katrina and Joshua. After their divorce she married again in 1987 to the actor and writer, Christopher Douglas. The marriage ended in divorce in 2008.

In the 1990s, she resumed her psychology studies, qualified as a psychotherapist and practised in London and later in Herefordshire until 2017.

Filmography

References

External links
 

1936 births
2019 deaths
English television actresses
People educated at Roundhay School
People from Altrincham